Charles Raymond Cox (born 10 June 1958) is an Australian former racing driver and motorsports commentator. He was brought up in the Sydney suburb of Gymea.

Racing career

His background is based on four wheels rather than two. His earliest exposure was in Australia in the late 1980s in the Production car-based "Street Sedans", raced on tracks in the Sydney area. He raced in the National Saloon Car Cup in Britain using a Ford Escort RS Cosworth in 1993 and 1994, winning many races and three class championships: British Salon Championship Class A 1993,1994 and British GT Championship Class A 1993 . He also won the Willhire 24 Hour at Snetterton, again in a Ford Escort RS Cosworth, in 1993. For 1995 he moved up to the British Touring Car Championship in a Ford Mondeo for his recently formed Thames Ford Dealers team with sponsorship from the Evening Standard newspaper. He caused a sensation in a wet race early in the season by finishing 5th, although behind both works Fords, choosing the correct tyres and recovering from an early spin. However, a huge barrel-rolling crash at Thruxton left him with concussion, and caused him to miss several races. When he returned it was in a hatchback Mondeo, making him the first driver to race one in the BTCC. He raced occasionally in Sportscars subsequently, as well as some appearances at the Bathurst 1000.

Racing record

Complete British Touring Car Championship results
(key) (Races in bold indicate pole position) (Races in italics indicate fastest lap)

Complete V8 Supercar Championship results

Complete Bathurst 1000 results

Commentary career
His second career began when he started commentating on BTCC in 1997 alongside Murray Walker. For 1998 Walker left, and was replaced by 1982 Formula One World Championship runner-up John Watson. When the BBC lost BTCC coverage, they switched Cox to motorbike coverage alongside Steve Parrish and Suzi Perry.

He then moved onto commentating on MotoGP for the BBC in partnership with former GP racer Steve Parrish. Cox became known for numerous catchphrases andone-liners. He frequently referred to co-commentator Steve Parrish as "Oracle".

Top Gear Australia 
Cox was named as one of the hosts of the first season of Top Gear Australia, along with cartoonist Warren Brown and advanced driving instructor Steve Pizzati, which premiered on SBS on 29 September 2008.

On 19 December 2008, Cox announced his departure from Top Gear Australia due to lack of time. He was replaced by jazz musician and motoring fan, James Morrison.

References

British Touring Car Championship drivers
1960 births
Living people
Supercars Championship drivers
Motorsport announcers
Racing drivers from Sydney
Sportsmen from New South Wales